Mai Der Vang is a Hmong American poet.

Life and education 
Vang was born in Fresno, California. Vang's parents resettled in the United States in 1981 as Hmong refugees fleeing Laos.

She graduated from University of California, Berkeley with a degree in English, and from Columbia University with an MFA in Creative Writing-Poetry.

Her book, Afterland, won the 2016 Walt Whitman Award selected by Carolyn Forche. Afterland was longlisted for the National Book Award for Poetry in 2017, as well as a finalist for the 2018 Kate Tufts Discovery Award.

Vang is a "finalist for the 2022 Pulitzer Prize in Poetry."

Works 
 Afterland: poems Minneapolis, Minnesota: Graywolf Press, 2017. , *
 Yellow Rain: Poems

Awards and honors 

Walt Whitman Award, 2016.
National Book Award Finalist, 2017.
Lannan Literary Fellowship, 2017.
Kate Tufts Discovery Award finalist for Afterland (2018).

References

External links
 
 From History to Poetry: Mai Der Vang Explores the Archival Record in Her Celebrated Volume "Yellow Rain
 https://www.poets.org/poetsorg/poet/mai-der-vang 
 https://www.poetryfoundation.org/poetrymagazine/poems/91680/after-all-have-gone
 https://fairytalereview.com/2017/06/27/create-rupture-mai-der-vang/

1981 births
Living people
UC Berkeley College of Letters and Science alumni
Columbia University School of the Arts alumni
21st-century American poets
21st-century American women writers
American women poets
Writers from Fresno, California
Poets from California
American people of Hmong descent
American writers of Hmong descent
American poets of Asian descent